Chen Yizhi (1902 – 14 April 1997) was a Chinese politician. She was among the first group of women elected to the Legislative Yuan in 1948.

Biography
Chen was born in Xiangcheng County in Henan Province in 1903. She attended , where she graduated from the Department of Education. She subsequently taught at the university's high school, where she later became headmistress.

As part of the 1948 parliamentary elections, five members were elected to the Legislative Yuan to represent universities, with Chen one of the five elected. She subsequently relocated to Taiwan during the Chinese Civil War.

References

1902 births
Chinese schoolteachers
20th-century Chinese educators
20th-century Chinese women politicians
Members of the 1st Legislative Yuan
Members of the 1st Legislative Yuan in Taiwan
1997 deaths